Wet Camp Village is a census-designated place in Pinal County, in the U.S. state of Arizona. The population was 229 at the 2010 census.

Demographics

References

Census-designated places in Pinal County, Arizona
Census-designated places in Arizona